She's a Sheik is a 1927 American silent comedy adventure film produced and distributed by Paramount Pictures and starring Bebe Daniels. A 16mm print of the film was rediscovered in 2017 by Kevin Brownlow.

Story
Likable sendup comedy uses many of the elements and pokes fun at the Valentino 'sheik' films with the exception that a woman, played by Bebe Daniels,  is the protagonist.

Cast
Bebe Daniels as Zaida
Richard Arlen as Captain Colton
William Powell as Kada
Josephine Dunn as Wanda Fowler
James Bradbury Jr as Jerry
Billy Franey as Joe
Paul McAllister as Sheik Yusif ben Hamad
Al Fremont as The major

References

External links

Bebe Daniels probably in dress for She's A Sheik
Stills at silenthollywood.com

1927 films
American silent feature films
Films directed by Clarence G. Badger
Lost American films
1927 lost films
Famous Players-Lasky films
Paramount Pictures films
American black-and-white films
1920s adventure comedy films
American adventure comedy films
Lost adventure comedy films
1927 comedy films
1920s American films
Silent American comedy films
Silent adventure comedy films
1920s English-language films